Jean Studer (12 September 1914 – 23 February 2009) was a Swiss athlete. He competed in the men's long jump at the 1936 Summer Olympics and the 1948 Summer Olympics.

References

External links
 

1914 births
2009 deaths
Athletes (track and field) at the 1936 Summer Olympics
Athletes (track and field) at the 1948 Summer Olympics
Swiss male long jumpers
Olympic athletes of Switzerland
Place of birth missing